The economy of Laos is a lower-middle income developing economy. Being one of the socialist states (along with China, Cuba, Vietnam and North Korea), the Lao economic model resembles the Chinese socialist market and/or Vietnamese socialist-oriented market economies by combining high degrees of state ownership with an openness to foreign direct investment and private ownership in a predominantly market-based framework.

Following independence, Laos established a Soviet-type planned economy. As part of economic restructuring that aimed to integrate Laos into the globalized world market, Laos underwent reforms called the New Economic Mechanism in 1986 that decentralized government control and encouraged private enterprise alongside state-owned enterprises. Currently, Laos ranks amongst the fastest growing economies in the world, averaging 8% a year in GDP growth. It is also forecasted that Laos will sustain at least 7% growth through 2019 as well.

The key goals for the government include pursuing poverty reduction and education for all children, also with its initiative to become a "land-linked" country. This is showcased through the ongoing construction of the nearly $6 billion high-speed rail from Kunming, China to Vientiane, Laos. The country opened a stock exchange, the Lao Securities Exchange in 2011, and has become a rising regional player in its role as a hydroelectric power supplier to neighbors such as China, Vietnam and Thailand.  In the current period, the economy of Laos relies largely on foreign direct investment to attract the capital from overseas to support its continual economic rigorousness. The long-term goal of the Lao economy as enshrined in the constitution is economic development in the direction of socialism by creating the material conditions to move towards socialism.

Despite rapid growth, Laos remains one of the poorest countries in Southeast Asia. A landlocked country, it has inadequate infrastructure and a largely unskilled work force. Nonetheless, Laos continues to attract foreign investment as it integrates with the larger ASEAN Economic Community, due to its plentiful, young workforce, and favorable tax treatment.

Laos has significant hydropower resources with large-scale hydropower being widespread; the country has also significant potential for small-scale hydro and solar power. Excessive production of electricity from hydropower is exported to other countries; despite this, the country continues to also rely on coal in its electricity production.

Economic history

With the overthrow of the Laotian monarchy in 1975, the Pathet Lao's communist government instituted a planned economy of the Soviet-style command economy system, replacing the private sector with state enterprises and cooperatives; centralizing investment, production, trade, and pricing; and creating barriers to internal and foreign trade.

Seizure of power by the Communists also resulted in a withdrawal of mainly American external investment, on which the country had become greatly dependent as a result of the destruction of domestic capital during the Indochina Wars.

This changed in 1986 when the government announced its "new economic mechanism" (NEM). Initially timid, the NEM was expanded to include a range of reforms designed to create conditions conducive to private sector activity. Prices set by market forces replaced government-determined prices. Farmers were permitted to own land and sell crops on the open market. State firms were granted increased decision-making authority and lost most of their subsidies and pricing advantages. The government set the exchange rate close to real market levels, lifted trade barriers, replaced import barriers with tariffs, and gave private sector firms direct access to imports and credit.

With the growing unrest in Eastern Europe and the Soviet Union, in 1989, the PDR Lao government reached agreement with the World Bank and the International Monetary Fund on additional reforms. The government agreed to introduce fiscal and monetary reform, promote private enterprise and foreign investment, privatize or close state firms, and strengthen banking. It also agreed to maintain a market exchange rate, reduce tariffs, and eliminate unneeded trade regulations. A liberal foreign investment code was also enacted. Enforcement of intellectual property rights is governed by two Prime Minister's Decrees dating from 1995 and 2002.

In an attempt to stimulate further international commerce, the PDR Lao government accepted Australian aid to build a bridge across the Mekong River to Thailand. The "Thai-Lao Friendship Bridge", between Vientiane Prefecture and Nong Khai Province, Thailand, was inaugurated in April 1994. Although the bridge has created additional commerce, the Lao government does not yet permit a completely free flow of traffic across the span.

These reforms led to economic growth and an increased availability of goods. However, the 1997 Asian Financial Crisis, coupled with the Lao government's own mismanagement of the economy, resulted in spiraling inflation and a steep depreciation of the kip, which lost 87% of its value from June 1997 to June 1999. Tighter monetary policies brought about greater macroeconomic stability in FY 2000, and monthly inflation, which had averaged about 10% during the first half of FY 1999, dropped to an average 1% over the same period in FY 2000.

In FY 1999, foreign grants and loans accounted for more than 20% of GDP and more than 75% of public investment.

The economy continues to be dominated by an unproductive agricultural sector operating largely outside the money economy and in which the public sector continues to play a dominant role. Still, a number of private enterprises have been founded in industries such as handicrafts, beer, coffee and tourism. With United Nations, Japanese, and German support, a formerly state-controlled chamber of commerce aims to promote private business: the Lao National Chamber of Commerce and Industry and its provincial subdivisions.

The latest round of state-owned enterprise reform in 2019 aims to ensure that the remaining SOEs become profitable ventures that are efficient and sustainable sources of income for the national treasury. These measures include closing unproductive enterprises, ensure businesses in which the state has investments are reformed into profitable ventures, and reduce corruption. As of 2019, the State-Owned Enterprise Development and Insurance Department of the Lao government has 183 enterprises under its supervision.

Laos faced an economic crisis in 2022. Caused by the COVID-19 pandemic and external debt primarily from China, it escalated into massive inflation and a debt crisis, bringing the country to the brink of default.

Agriculture

Agriculture, mostly subsistence rice farming, dominates the economy, employing an estimated 85% of the population and producing 51% of GDP. Domestic savings are low, forcing Laos to rely heavily on foreign assistance and concessional loans as investment sources for economic development.

Agricultural products include sweet potatoes, vegetables, corn, coffee, sugarcane, tobacco, cotton, tea, peanuts, rice; water buffalo, pigs, cattle, poultry.

In mid-2012, the Laos government issued a four-year moratorium for new mining projects. The reasons cited were environmental and social concerns relating to the use of agricultural land.

In 2019 Laos produced:
3.4 million tons of rice;
3.1 million tons of roots and tubers;
2.2 million tons of cassava;
1.9 million tons of sugarcane;
1.5 million tons of vegetable;
1.0 million tons of banana;
717 thousand tons of maize;
196 thousand tons of watermelon;
165 thousand tons of coffee;
154 thousand tons of taro;
114 thousand tons of sweet potato;
56 thousand tons of tobacco;
53 thousand tons of peanut;
46 thousand tons of orange;
43 thousand tons of pineapple;
23 thousand tons of papaya;
8.6 thousand tons of tea;

In addition to smaller productions of other agricultural products.

Tourism

Tourism is the fastest growing industry in the economy and plays a vital role in the Lao economy. The government opened Laos to the world in the 1990s, and continues to be a popular destination amongst tourists.

Other statistics
GDP: purchasing power parity - $14.2 billion (2009 est.)
Exchange rate - kips (LAK) per US dollar - 8,556.56 (2009), 8,760.69 (2008), 9,658 (2007), 10,235 (2006), 10,820 (2005)

Oil - production:
0 bbl/d (2009 est.)
Oil - consumption:
 (2009 est.)
Oil - exports:
0 bbl/d (2007 est.)
Oil - imports:
 (2007 est.)

Of the total foreign investment in Laos in 2012, the mining industry got 27% followed by electricity generation which has 25% share.

References

External links

Rice research in Lao PDR
Rice Biodiversity in Lao PDR 

Economy of Laos